Ansgar Bethge was Inspector of the Navy from 1980 to 1985.

References

Bibliography

 Dermot Bradley: Die Generale und Admirale der Bundeswehr. Band 1 (Adam – Fuhr), Osnabrück 1998, .

Vice admirals of the German Navy
1924 births
2008 deaths
Bundesmarine admirals
Knights Commander of the Order of Merit of the Federal Republic of Germany
Chiefs of Navy (Germany)